Gilvan Rural District is in Gilvan District of Tarom County, Zanjan province, Iran. At the National Census of 2006, its population was 10,913 in 2,716 households, when it was in the Central District. There were 11,360 inhabitants in 3,227 households at the following census of 2011. At the most recent census of 2016, the population of the rural district was 10,830 in 3,443 households. The largest of its 41 villages was Gilvan, with 2,508 people. After the census, the rural district was elevated to the status of a district and divided into two rural districts and the city of Gilvan.

References 

Tarom County

Rural Districts of Zanjan Province

Populated places in Zanjan Province

Populated places in Tarom County